Glenavon is a village in the Canadian province of Saskatchewan within the Rural Municipality of Chester No. 125 and Census Division No. 5.

History 
Glenavon incorporated as a village on April 13, 1910.

Demographics 

History

Murder of Anna Juswiak 
On May 5, 1950, 23-year old Polish émigrée Anna Juswiak boarded a train in Regina bound for Glenavon, where she was to meet friends of her fiancé, Stanley Kisilowski. On May 6, Juswiak's body was discovered in the backyard of a Glenavon home, "her head battered by a blunt instrument." Subsequently, Royal Canadian Mounted Police interviewed a man registered as "Leo Beaudry" from Portage La Prairie at a hotel in Kipling, identifying him as 25-year old John Woltucky, an ex-military and ex-convict using an alias, who had been released from penitentiary in Prince Albert on April 17, 1950. Woltucky was previously serving out a three-year sentence for illegal possession of a firearm, five charges of housebreaking, and theft of a parka. Police were initially "convinced that Woltucky did not answer to the description of the man they were looking for," but, with additional information from authorities in Glenavon, picked up Woltucky at the train station minutes before he was to board an outbound train. Among his personal effects, police discovered a bank book belonging to Ms. Juswiak. Two women from Kipling, Saskatchewan, Mrs. Lars Pearson and Mrs. Alf Johnston, identified Woltucky as having disembarked the train in Glenavon accompanying Juswiak. 

The trial of John Woltucky proved sensational for the small town of Glenavon, where, "nothing like it had ever happened before in the peaceful community." In multiple newspapers, the murder of Anna Juswiak was initially reported as a shooting. During the trial, Glenavon's population of roughly 250 was "augmented by some 200 non-residents." According to Regina Leader-Post reporter Robert Tyre, "the murder itself was overshadowed by the antics of the villagers who deserted home, business, and family en masse to prowl and poke about the scene of the crime like an army of Scotland Yard detectives gravely and earnestly searching for clues." 

Woltucky was convicted and found guilty twice, both times sentenced to the death penalty. During his detainment, he underwent psychological testing at Weyburn's Souris Valley Mental Health Hospital, from which he escaped on July 2, 1951 and was later re-apprehended.

See also 

 List of communities in Saskatchewan
 Villages of Saskatchewan

References

Villages in Saskatchewan
Chester No. 125, Saskatchewan
Division No. 5, Saskatchewan